The 1983–84 season was the 38th season in FK Partizan's existence. This article shows player statistics and matches that the club played during the 1983–84 season.

Friendlies

Competitions

Yugoslav First League

Matches

Yugoslav Cup

European Cup

First round

Second round

See also
 List of FK Partizan seasons

References

External links
 Official website
 Partizanopedia 1983-84  (in Serbian)

FK Partizan seasons
Partizan